Derick Armstrong (born April 2, 1979) is a former gridiron football wide receiver.  He most recently played for the Edmonton Eskimos and the BC Lions of the Canadian Football League.

Early life
Armstrong was born in Jasper, Texas. He attended Tyler Junior College and the University of Arkansas at Monticello.

Professional career
Armstrong began his football career with the Saskatchewan Roughriders of the CFL where he played for two seasons, and in 2002 he was a CFL All-Star. After his success in the CFL, Armstrong signed with the Houston Texans of the NFL.  He was signed as an undrafted free agent out of the University of Arkansas at Monticello. He played there for three seasons, playing in 35 games registering 45 catches for 605 yards and two touchdowns.

On September 19, 2006, Armstrong returned to the CFL and joined the Winnipeg Blue Bombers' receiving corps, playing in the final five games of the season. Armstrong would continue to be a force on offence as he posted back-to-back 1000 yard seasons in 2007 and 2008. However, under a new regime in 2009, Armstrong would see an end to his time as a Blue Bomber as he got into an altercation with new head coach, Mike Kelly. After being informed that he would be a designated import (one of three import players that would not start), Armstrong refused to play. As such, he was released on July 8, 2009 after dressing in only one game that season.

After sitting out the entire 2009 CFL season, Armstrong signed with the BC Lions on February 4, 2010, reuniting him with Roy Shivers, the former GM of the Saskatchewan Roughriders who originally signed him to the CFL. Despite being the team's second leading receiver after week 6, Armstrong was released on August 10, 2010, with the team opting to use the younger Darius Passmore.

Armstrong was signed midway through the 2010 season by the Edmonton Eskimos, but was released in the off-season on December 16, 2010.

Statistics

References

External links 
NFL stats
databaseFootball.com

1979 births
Living people
American football wide receivers
Arkansas–Monticello Boll Weevils football players
Canadian football wide receivers
Edmonton Elks players
Houston Texans players
People from Jasper, Texas
Players of American football from Texas
Saskatchewan Roughriders players
Tyler Apaches football players
Winnipeg Blue Bombers players